Konrad Kaczmarek (born 1 March 1991) is a Polish footballer who plays as a forward, most recently for Chrobry Głogów.

External links

References

1991 births
Living people
Association football forwards
Polish footballers
Ekstraklasa players
I liga players
II liga players
Śląsk Wrocław players
Olimpia Grudziądz players
KS Polkowice players
ŁKS Łódź players
Chrobry Głogów players
People from Głogów
Sportspeople from Lower Silesian Voivodeship